Charikar is a district of Parwan province, Afghanistan. The capital city of Charikar District is Charikar. The population in 2019 was estimated to be 198,306.

See also 
 Charikar
 Districts of Afghanistan

References

Districts of Parwan Province